The Master's de Patinage is an annual figure skating test competition held in September in Villard de Lans, France. Skaters compete in the disciplines of men's singles, ladies' singles, pair skating, and ice dancing at the senior and junior levels.

Senior medalists

Men

Ladies

Pairs

Ice dancing

Junior medalists

Men

Ladies

Pairs

Ice dancing

References 

Figure skating competitions
Figure skating in France